Charandas Chor (Charandas the Thief) is a 1975 children's film by noted director Shyam Benegal, based on the famous play by Habib Tanvir, which itself was an adaptation of a classical Rajasthani folktale by Vijaydan Detha. The lyrics of the film were also by Habib Tanvir.

The film starred Smita Patil, Lalu Ram, Madanlal and Habib Tanvir.

Plot
The film is derived from a classic folk tale, originally narrated by Vijaydan Detha, and interpreted as folk play by Habib Tanvir. The film charts the tumultuous life of a petty thief, Charandas (Lalu Ram). Curiously he is a man of principles – an honest thief with a strong sense of integrity and professional efficiency. He makes four vows to his Guru, that he would never eat in a gold plate, never lead a procession that is in his honour, never become a king and never marry a princess, thinking all of them are far out possibilities for him. Later, his guru adds a fifth one - never to tell a lie and sets him of on his life's journey which leads him to a kingdom, where the turn of events make him famous, and eventually he is offered the seat of political power which he has to refuse. Later, the local princess (Smita Patil) gets enchanted by him, and proposes to marry him. This is when his refusal costs him his life. As he is put to death, he illustrates the inherent paradox in human existence, where truthful existence becomes an impossibility, for the truthful and the accidentally truthfuls, alike.

Cast
 Lalu Ram as Charandas
 Smita Patil as Princess
 Madanlal
 Fida Bhai
 Sadhu Meher
 Habib Tanvir
 Anjali Paigankar 
 Sunder
 Baby Dass
 Babu
 Kemal Kar

References

External links
 
 Charandas Chor FTVdatabase

1975 films
Films with screenplays by Shama Zaidi
Films directed by Shyam Benegal
Indian films based on plays
Indian children's films
1970s Hindi-language films